The 1986 ABC Under-18 Championship was the ninth edition of the Asian Basketball Confederation (ABC)'s Junior Championship. The games were held at Manila, Philippines from December 28, 1986, to January 4, 1987. PhTaiwan came to Seoul to participate the competition, but withdrew later due to the conflict about using the Chinese flag during the event.

Venue
The games were held at Rizal Memorial Coliseum, located in Manila. On April 14, 1984, ABC Executive Committee had a meeting at the Walkerhill Hotel, Seoul and decided to hold the next event at Kuala Lumpur, Malaysia, but later changed to Manila, Philippines.

Preliminary round

Final

Final standings

Awards

See also
 1986 ABC Under-18 Championship for Women

References

 
 
 
 
 
 
 

FIBA Asia Under-18 Championship
ABC Under-18 Championship
ABC Under-18 Championship
ABC Under-18 Championship
International basketball competitions hosted by the Philippines
ABC Under-18 Championship